The 2009–10 Principality Premiership was the fifteenth Principality Premiership season and the sixth under its current format. The season began in August 2009 and ended in May 2010. Fourteen teams played each other on a home and away basis, with teams earning four points for a win, and a bonus point for scoring four or more tries in a match. The losing team may also earn a bonus point if they lose by seven points or less.

British and Irish Cup qualification and play-off news

The top six clubs from the 2008-09 season qualified for the new British and Irish Cup competition. A play-off system was added at the end of the season for the top eight sides to qualify for the following season's British and Irish Cup. Only six teams can qualify for this from the eight. These play-offs do not decide the League Championship, as the league leaders at the end of the regular 26 game season will be Champions. The winners of the play-offs would win a one-off trophy.

The fourteen teams competing consisted of Aberavon RFC, Bedwas RFC, Cardiff RFC, Carmarthen Quins, Cross Keys RFC, Ebbw Vale RFC, Glamorgan Wanderers RFC, Llandovery RFC, Llanelli RFC, Neath RFC, Newport RFC, Pontypool RFC, Pontypridd RFC, Swansea RFC.

Teams

Stadiums

Table

Fixtures & results

Week 1

Week 2

Week 3

Week 4

Week 5

Week 6

Week 7

Week 8

Week 9

Week 10

Week 11

Week 12

Week 13

Week 14

Week 15

Week 16

Week 17

Week 18

Week 19

Week 20

Week 21

Week 22

Week 23

Week 24

Week 25

Week 26

Week 27

Week 28

Week 29

Week 30

British and Irish Cup play-offs

Elimination play-offs

Llandovery qualify for next season's British and Irish Cup, Aberavon are eliminated.

Llanelli qualify for next season's British and Irish Cup, Cardiff are eliminated.

Qualifying play-offs

Preliminary Semi-finals

Pontypridd were found guilty of fielding an ineligible player and so were expelled from the play-offs. Llandovery took their place in the semi-finals.

Semi-finals

Final

Neath win 3–1 on try count

External links

Welsh Premier Division seasons
2009–10 in Welsh rugby union
Wales